Hard Knox Roller Girls (HKRG) is a women's flat-track roller derby league based in Knoxville, Tennessee. Founded in 2006, HKRG is a member of the Women's Flat Track Derby Association (WFTDA).

History and structure
After forming in 2006, Hard Knox played in multiple venues before moving to the Knoxville Civic Coliseum. In 2016, HKRG relocated to the Cooper Athletic Center at Maryville College and celebrated their tenth anniversary season. HKRG is a 501(c)3 non-profit organization that is skater owned and operated, and a portion of all proceeds from each bout is donated to charity. Hard Knox became a member of the WFTDA in early 2009.

The HKRG league comprises two teams: Hard Knox Roller Girls Allstars (WFTDA A team) and Brawlers (B team).

WFTDA competition
In 2010, Hard Knox qualified for WFTDA Playoffs for the first time, as the ninth seed at the WFTDA South Central Regional Tournament in Lincoln. Nebraska. Knoxville lost their first two games to No Coast Derby Girls (Lincoln) and Tampa Bay Derby Darlins, but then won their final game against Memphis Roller Derby 165–124 to claim ninth place.

Rankings

References

External links
HKRG Official Website

Roller derby leagues in Tennessee
Sports in Knoxville, Tennessee
Roller derby leagues established in 2006
2006 establishments in Tennessee
Women's sports in Tennessee